Xin Yunlai (born September 22, 1994) is a Chinese actor under Beijing Enlight Media. He was born in  Wuxi City, Jiangsu Province. In 2016, he joined the Chinese boy group "Attack! Bigboy" and officially entered the entertainment industry. Yunlai made his acting debut on 2018 when he played Gu Sen Xi in the 2018 Chinese film "Cry Me A Sad River."  Since then, he has appeared in various films and television dramas, including the 2019 time-traveling historical romance drama, “Dreaming Back to the Qing Dynasty”.

Career

2018-2019: Acting Debut 
On September 21, 2018, Xin Yunlai made his acting debut when he played the role of Gu Senxiang's twin brother Gu Senxi in the youth campus film "Cry Me A Sad River", with Zhao Yingbo, Ren Min and Zhang Ruonan.  The film earned 357 million yuan at the box office. In the same year, he made his television debut when he co-starred with Li Guangjie, Fei Qiming and Sun Qian in the youth campus drama "Waiting for You in the Future", in which he played Chen Tong, a guy who turned from enemies into friends with Liu Dazhi (Li Guangjie).  on December 13, he won the Online Actor of the Year Award in the 9th Niu Er Entertainment Festival industry interconnection.

In October 2019, it was announced that he will be starring in the online drama "Mr Honesty" with Shimin Chen, Jie Liang, and Haikuan Liu to be released in June 2020. He played the role of Fang Zhiyou, a CEO of an architecture company. On December 14, he co-starred in the historical drama "Dreaming Back to the Qing Dynasty" with Li Landi and Wang Anyu, in which he played the arrogant, brave and wise fourteenth brother Aixinjueluo Yinyu. This was also the first time he played in a historical-themed film and television work.

2020-present: The Blessed Girl, The Pioneer, and My Blue Summer 
On December 4, 2020, he had a quick appearance in the romantic fantasy movie The End of Endless Love, starring Zhang Ruonan and Sun Chenjun.

On January 29, 2021, He played Yin Xiao in the ancient costume adventure fantasy drama The Blessed Girl co-starring Zhao Jinmai and Yuan Hong. In July 1, the film The Pioneer was released, in which he played Deng Zhongxia. In September 29, it was announced that together with Yan Ni, Yao Chen, and Wang Luodan, Yunlai will be part of the family drama "Gone Grandma". On September 30, the youth comedy film "The Water Boys" was released nationwide, in which he played Zhang Wei, an ordinary-looking and middle-range sophomore. He worked with his co-stars Feng Xiangkun, Li Xiaoqian, Wu Junting, Wang Chuan in co-producing the movie's ending song. 

On January 29, 2022, the youth campus drama "I Don't Want To Be Brothers With You" starring Chen Youwei and Lu Fangsheng was broadcast on Mango TV, in which he played the role of Gao Yang. In February 14 of the same year, he played the role of Lu Liu in the film "Ten Years of Loving You". In May 20, the film "Stay With Me" was released, in which he played Xu Jiashu. In June 2, The film My Blue Summer, co-starring Zhang Xueying, was released, in which he played Sheng Huainan. He also starred in the suspense drama "Desire Catcher" and played the young criminal police officer Luo Fei. On June 14, the filiming of the costume drama "The Legend of Shen Li" started. In November, he participated in the 2022 China Golden Rooster Hundred Flowers Film Festival and the opening ceremony of the 35th China's Golden Rooster Film Awards.

Early life 
Xin Yunlai, born on September 22, 1994 in Wuxi City, Jiangsu Province.

Works

Filmography

Films

Tv shows

Discography

Singles

Awards and nominations

References

External links 

 
 
 

Living people
1994 births
Male actors from Jiangsu
Sin clans
People from Wuxi